Flavio Medina (born April 19, 1978) is a Mexican actor.

Biography
Flavio Medina was born in Mexico City, Mexico, D.F. His first experience with live theater was during his childhood, when the grandson of Juan Grandini, passionate and illuminating an old theater, invited him to attend several plays from the catwalks of the Insurgentes Theater, meeting the greatest revelation you have had in life: to live theater.

Clinging to his idea manages to start studying theater behind his father, who had designed for him apparently prosperous future through medicine. Register with the CEC Trigger school, jumping, three years after the National School of Classical Dance INBA and complements their studies with the support of several professors in other disciplines, singing.

Career
Thus is immersed in a series of theatrical productions such as (Un Rufián en la Escalera), (El pelícano), (El Método Grönholm), Regina, (El Enterrador), (El Zapatero), (Vaselina 2001), (Los Tres Sexos de la Luna), Por Amarte Tanto, (Silencio Pollos Pelones), (Doña Rosita la Soltera), (La casa de Bernarda Alba), (La casa de Hasan), Bagdad, (Las Preciosas Ridículas), (Avenida Q) among others.

But thanks to his perseverance and studies get to do one of his greatest childhood dreams, stepping on the Insurgentes theater with the musical Fama (with which also made the trip to Venezuela, Puerto Rico and Dominican Republic) Anastasia, (Aladino), (Pinocho el Musical), (Amor sin Barreras), (Cabaret) and (Víctor Victoria).

The experience and the various techniques have led to Medina to share the stage with national figures of theater and attract the attention of film and television producers who have been invited to participate in various projects.

On television programs such as Mujer, casos de la vida real, (La hora pico), Por un beso and Salomé. Recently excelled in Alma de Hierro successful in their role of 'Amadeo' in 2009 participated in two films and a short, important to the industry (Depositarios), (Háblame), (Hidalgo: la Historia jámas) a film made to mark the bicentennial. Closed season in the worldwide hit in (Agosto Condado de Osage) and wait, anxiously, free time to enjoy a few days of beach, where you can meditate and practice eastern philosophy you're passionate about, drinking coffee and reading adentrase to metaphysical material that redeems him as banal concerns of many black dress for special occasions.

In 2010 the call to join the cast of the telenovela Para Volver a Amar (telenovela), playing a man who can not find work in Mexico, is leaving the United States illegally. For 2012 as part of the musical and the cast of (Pegados) and new telenovela of Carlos Moreno in Amor bravío, he plays a helpless and ambitious man, he play an antagonist called 'Alonso Lacazno'.

Flavio Medina starred as the antagonist in Carlos Moreno Laguillo's telenovela: Quiero amarte.

In 2014, he was confirmed to star in Gisselle González's hit Yo no creo en los hombres as the Main Antagonist alongside Adriana Louvier and Gabriel Soto.

Filmography

Film roles

Television roles

Awards and nominations

References

External links
 

1978 births
Living people
Male actors from Mexico City
21st-century Mexican male actors
Mexican male telenovela actors
Mexican male film actors